Defi may refer to:

 DéFI (Democratic Federalist Independent), a political party in Belgium
 Defi language
 Défi sportif, disabled multisport event
 Le Défi, a defunct America's Cup syndicate from France
 Le Défi Media Group, mass media company in Mauritius
 10332 Défi, a main belt asteroid discovered in 1991
 Decentralized finance, a form of finance based on cryptocurrencies

See also
 Defy (disambiguation)